Janice Lenore Meyers (née Crilly; July 20, 1928 – June 21, 2019) was an American Republican party politician and a member of the United States House of Representatives from Kansas.

Biography
Meyers was born in Lincoln, Nebraska. She attended public schools in Superior, Nebraska, and attended William Woods College in Fulton, Missouri. She graduated with a Bachelor of Arts degree from the University of Nebraska–Lincoln in 1951. From 1951 until 1954, she worked as an advertising and public relations assistant for a radio station in Omaha and a department store in Lincoln, Nebraska. From 1967 to 1972, she was a city councilwoman in Overland Park, Kansas. From 1972 until 1984, she was a member of the Kansas Senate. In 1978, she ran for the United States Senate, but was defeated in a multi-candidate Republican primary which was won by Nancy Landon Kassebaum.

In 1984, she was elected as a member of the Republican Party to the 99th United States Congress and to the five succeeding Congresses. She served from January 3, 1985, until January 3, 1997. During the 104th United States Congress, she was the chairwoman of the United States House Committee on Small Business. She was not a candidate for re-election to the 105th United States Congress. She was the first Republican woman elected to the U.S. House from Kansas. Her son, Phil Meyers, ran for a congressional seat in Hawaii in 2000 as a Republican against Rep. Neil Abercrombie, but was defeated.

Meyers died from heart disease on June 21, 2019, at a hospital in Merriam, Kansas.

See also
Women in the United States House of Representatives

References

External links

  Women in Congress: Jan Meyers

|-

1928 births
2019 deaths
Female members of the United States House of Representatives
Kansas city council members
Republican Party Kansas state senators
Politicians from Lincoln, Nebraska
People from Superior, Nebraska
Politicians from Overland Park, Kansas
Businesspeople from Nebraska
Republican Party members of the United States House of Representatives from Kansas
University of Nebraska–Lincoln alumni
Women state legislators in Kansas
Women city councillors in Kansas
20th-century American businesspeople
20th-century American women
21st-century American women
Deaths from heart disease